Prudential Assurance Building may refer to:

 Prudential Assurance Building, Liverpool
 Holborn Bars, London (former Prudential Assurance headquarters in Holborn)

Prudential plc